Bizaar is the sixth studio album by the American hip hop group Insane Clown Posse. Released on October 31, 2000 by Island Records in association with Psychopathic Records, it is the first half of the Bizaar Bizzar double album, released the same day as its companion album, Bizzar. It is the 14th overall release by Insane Clown Posse.

Release and reception 
On the August 20, 1999, episode of The Howard Stern Show, Insane Clown Posse clashed with fellow guest Sharon Osbourne, and she bet Violent J $50,000 that ICP's next album would not sell more than 200,000 copies, and that it would be subsequently dropped from its distributor. Violent J then increased the bet, predicting that the group's next album would sell at least 500,000 units.

Bizaar and Bizzar combined to sell 400,000 units, which fell short of Violent J's prediction, but exceeded Sharon Osbourne's expectations. Following the release of the albums, Insane Clown Posse left Island Records after its contract expired because, according to the group, they did not want to release its sixth Joker's Card through Island Records.

Both Bizaar and Bizzar received three-out-of-five-star ratings in The New Rolling Stone Album Guide, the highest rating that the magazine ever gave to any Insane Clown Posse album.

"Tilt-a-Whirl" was ranked by VH1 as one of the 40 Most Awesomely Bad Metal Songs...Ever.

The song "Still Stabbin'" is a sequel to "I Stab People".

Track listing 
 "Intro" – 2:07
 "Take Me Away" – 4:39
 "Fearless" – 4:14
 "Rainbows and Stuff" – 4:11
 "Whut?" (featuring Twiztid) – 4:55
 "Still Stabbin'" – 4:03
 "Tilt-A-Whirl" – 3:58
 "We Gives No Fuck" – 3:39
 "Please Don't Hate Me" – 4:18
 "Behind the Paint" – 4:33
 "My Homie Baby Mama" – 4:09
 "The Pendulum's Promise" – 21:25

Charts

References 
General

 

Specific

2000 albums
Albums produced by Mike E. Clark
Horrorcore albums
Insane Clown Posse albums
Island Records albums
Psychopathic Records albums